Wang Thong is a district (amphoe) of Phitsanulok province, central Thailand.

History
Wang Thong was established in 1895 as Nakhon Pa Mak District, named after the central tambon, the district office being located in Ban Sam Ruen. However, the original location was difficult to reach and also flooded every year, and the district office was moved to the east side of the Wang Thong River, where the Wang Thong Municipal Market now stands.

In 1928 the government created Bang Krathum district, and tambons Phai Lom, Noen Kum, and Nakhon Pa Mak were assigned to it. Tambons Kaeng Sopha and Ban Klang of Nakhon Thai district were reassigned to Wang Thong.

When the buildings on the east bank of Wang Thong River were washed away by a flood, the district office relocated to its present site. In 1931 the district name was changed to Pa Mak, finally designated as Wang Thong in 1939.

Geography

Neighboring districts are (from the south clockwise), Sak Lek of Phichit province, Bang Krathum, Mueang Phitsanulok, Wat Bot, Chat Trakan, Nakhon Thai of Phitsanulok Province, Khao Kho of Phetchabun province and Noen Maprang of Phitsanulok Province.

Rivers
Wang Thong lies within the Nan Basin, which is part of the Chao Phraya Watershed. The important water resource is Wang Thong River (Khek River). The Khwae Noi River and Tha Muen Ram River also flow through this district.

Swamps
The Bueng Rachanok Swamp is a popular tourist destination in the district.

Administration
The district is divided into 11 sub-districts (tambons), which are further subdivided into 166 villages (mubans). Wang Thong is sub-district municipality (thesaban tambon) which covers part of the same-named tambon. There are a further 11 tambon administrative organizations (TAO).

Infrastructure

Significant Settlements
The following settlements of the Wang Thong District are significant enough in size as to occupy multiple mubans:
Town of Ban Wang Thong
Ban Gok Mai Daeng
Ban Din Thong
Ban Sadao
Ban Phan Chali
Ban Supraron Phanom Thong
Ban Nam Rin
Ban Mae Raka
Ban Kao Noi
Ban Kaeng Gula
Ban Kao Hom
Ban Dong Phluang

Radio
There is one radio station broadcast from Wang Thong, the Sathaanii Witthayu Ratthasaphaa (Parliament Radio Station). The frequency is 92.25 FM.

Attractions
Thung Salaeng Luang National Park
Kaeng Chet Khwae National Park
Sakunothayan Arboretum
Kaeng Song Waterfall
Kaeng Sopha Waterfall
Brotherly Villages Boat Race
Bueng Rachanok Swamp

Flooding
Wang Thong was hit by severe flooding in 2007. By 8 October 2007, flooding in the Wang Thong District had killed at least three people, and the district was declared a disaster zone.

References

External links
amphoe.com (Thai)
Kaeng Chet Khwae National Park

Wang Thong